Go-To Transport, Inc. based in Bay City, Michigan, is an American provider of freight services.

Corporate history

Go-To Transport, Inc. was formed in 2003 by siblings, Gary and Allison Short. It is based in Bay City, Michigan, located near the Saginaw Bay, on Michigan's east side. Go-To Transport, Inc. offers full truckload transportation services - including Dedicated, Expedited and Intermodal - within the 48 contiguous United States and Canada. Other services include freight-forwarding, brokering, and warehousing and distribution. The company employs drivers throughout the country and has two terminals in the Midwest. Major customers include: Dow Chemical, Dow Corning, British Petroleum, Ford, The Home Depot, Procter & Gamble, SC Johnson, Borg Warner, GMCCA and Anheuser-Busch.

In 2005, Go-To Transport, Inc. spun off a stand-alone technology company, TransIT Solutions. This entity specializes in creating customizable software for logistics and transportation management.

In 2012, Go-To Transport, Inc. spun off a stand-alone logistics company, Go-To Solutions.

Locations

Go-To Transport is based in Bay City, Michigan and has a remote offices in Green Bay, Wisconsin and Romulus, Michigan.

References

External links 
GO-TO TRANSPORT, INC. NAMED 2012 DIVERSITY CARRIER OF THE YEAR BY THE HOME DEPOT, Press Release
Compass Minerals Presents Service Excellence Awards, Press Release
Schneider Logistics Honors 19 Carriers at Annual Conference, Press Release, Schneider.com
Granholm Praises Bay City's Go-To Transport During Visit, MLive.com
Diesel Prices Crucial to Transportation Business in Great Lakes Bay Region, MLive.com
Transit Company to Add 105 Jobs in Bay City, The Bay City Times

Transport companies established in 2003
Companies based in Michigan